Otti may refer to:

People
 Alex Otti (born 1965), economist, banker in Nigeria
 David Otti (1940–2011), Ugandan football coach
 Otti Berger (1898–1944/45), textile artist, weaver and member of the Bauhaus
 Vincent Otti (1946–2007), deputy-leader of the Lord's Resistance Army (LRA), a rebel guerrilla army operating in Uganda and southern Sudan

Other
 Mitsubishi eK, a car, also known as Nissan Otti

See also
 Ottis
 Otto